MaryAnne Golon (born December 2, 1960) is Assistant Managing Editor and Director of Photography at The Washington Post.

Biography
She received a Bachelor of Science degree in journalism from the University of Florida and is a distinguished alumnus. She completed a fellowship in Public Policy Studies at Duke University in 1991.

Golon was Time Magazine's director of photography until June 30, 2008.  She managed the photography department of the newsweekly along with Michele Stephenson for over twenty years.   
Among her professional contributions to Time, Golon led the photography team that produced the Hurricane Katrina special edition and the September 11, 2001 special black-bordered edition, each winning National Magazine Awards for single issue topics.  Golon has received numerous individual picture-editing awards from Pictures of the Year International and the National Press Photographers Association Best of Photography competitions.

Golon was the on-site photography editor in Dhahran for Time magazine during the Gulf War. She was directly involved in the production of scores of award-winning Time covers and special editions.  She coordinated Time's photographic coverage of the Olympic Games for sixteen years.

Projects and honors
 Chair of Professional Advisory Board, NOOR photo agency, Amsterdam, The Netherlands 2009-2011
 Guest Director, LOOK 3, Festival of the Photograph, Charlottesville, Virginia, June 10–13, 2009
 Jury Chair, World Press Photo foundation, Amsterdam, The Netherlands, 2009
 Jury, World Press Photo foundation, Amsterdam, The Netherlands, 2008
 Jury, CHIPP, premier edition of China International Press Photo Contest, Shenzen, China 2005, 2012
 Faculty, Joop Swart Masterclass, World Press Photo foundation, The Netherlands 2002-2005
 Jury, Visa Pour L'Image, Perpignan, France 1996–1999, 2004, 2006, 2008–2009, 2012
 Faculty, Missouri Photo Workshop, 1999–2000, 2002–2008, 2012, 2014-18
 Faculty and member of Board of Directors, Eddie Adams Workshop, 1997–2000, 2008–2017
 Faculty, Summit Photographic Workshop, 1998, 2000, 2002, 2006–2009, 2012, 2015, 2018
 Jury, Pictures of the Year International competition, 1997, 1998, 2001

References

External links
 PopPhoto: Torch Passed at TIME Photo Desk
 Columbia Journalism Review: "Maryanne Golon on Photography as Journalism - from Iraq to Ann Coulter" by Thomas Lang
 CNN Transcripts: Golon interviewed by Kyra Phillips
 
 

1960 births
Living people
American women journalists
University of Florida alumni
20th-century American journalists
20th-century American women